The United States Geological Survey Library (USGS Library) is a program within the United States Geological Survey, a scientific bureau within the Department of Interior of the United States government. The USGS operates as a fact-finding research organization with no regulatory responsibility.

The USGS Library has major branches in Reston, Virginia (National Headquarters), Lakewood, Colorado (Denver Federal Center), and Menlo Park, California.

Description

Today the United States Geological Survey Library's users have access to over 3 million items: over 1.7 million books and journals, 700,000 maps, 370,000 microforms, 270,000 pamphlets, 260,000 black-and-white photographs, 60,000 color transparencies, 15,000 field record notebooks, and 250 videocassettes. Materials include USGS publications as well as those produced by state and foreign geological surveys, scientific societies, museums, academic institutions, and government scientific agencies. The libraries in Reston and Menlo Park have been designated as official Federal Government Depositories providing public access to selected U.S. Government publications.

U.S. Geological Survey Library Classification System
The newly revised classification system presented in this report is designed for use in the U.S. Geological Survey (USGS) Library and other earth science libraries. Prior to the administration of Fred Boughton Weeks, 1903–1908, the library lacked a classification scheme. The Dewey Decimal system for geologic material was not sufficiently developed to accommodate the range of specialized material collected at the USGS Library, and The Library of Congress Classification System had not yet been published. The library staff and patrons were concerned about continued development of the collection without an acceptable classification scheme. Mr. Weeks and bibliographer John M. Nickles of the library staff, with the assistance of three consultants from the New York Public Library, developed the USGS classification system designed specifically for an earth science library. The U.S. Geological Survey Library classification system has been designed for earth science libraries. It is a tool for assigning call numbers to earth science and allied pure science materials in order to collect these materials into related subject groups on the library shelves and arrange them alphabetically by author and title. The classification can be used as a retrieval system to access materials through the subject and geographic numbers. The classification scheme has been developed over the years since 1904 to meet the ever-changing needs of increased specialization and the development of new areas of research in the earth sciences.

Special library collections

Field Records Collection
The Field Records Collection is an archive of unpublished field notes, correspondence, manuscripts, maps, analysis reports and other data created or collected by USGS geologists during field studies and other project work. The majority of the collection dates from 1879 and relates to work done in the contiguous United States. Materials in the collection represent almost 130 years of scientific investigations by the USGS, from the earliest days of the agency to recently completed projects. Records contributed by approximately 1,200 USGS scientists are presently archived. Located in the Central Region Library in Denver, Colorado, the collection is available for on-premises examination during normal library hours. Field records and project archives on Alaska are kept in the Alaska Technical Data Unit Field Records Archive.

Rare Books and Maps
The Rare Book Collection of the USGS Library comprises unusual publications, rare books, and maps collected since 1879. Included are historical maps and publications of the Survey, as well as early publications of many federal, state and other geological surveys. Records of select geological societies are also maintained in the collection, such as the Geological Society of Washington, which was founded by John Wesley Powell and other noted scientists after the Civil War. Of special note are many 19th century maps with topics such as American political boundaries, transportation, geology, and mining.

Desnoyers Collection
At an auction in Paris, France, pieces of M. Jules Desnoyers's (1800–1887) library were purchased in 1885 by the USGS Library to start the foreign country collection. M. Desnoyers was a founder and later Secretary of the Société Géologique de France, and in 1834 he was appointed librarian of the Muséum National d'Histoire Naturelle in Paris.

William R. Halliday Collection
William R. Halliday, M.D. (b. 1926), joined the National Speleological Society in 1947. By the late 1950s he was director of the Western Speleological Survey. His works include Adventure Is Underground (1959), Caves of California (1962), Caves of Washington (1963), Depths of the Earth (1966), Caves and Cavers of the United States (1966), American Caves and Caving (1974), Discovery and Exploration of the Oregon Caves: Oregon Caves National Monument (with Frank K. Walsh; 1976) and, Floyd Collins of Sand Cave: A Photographic Memorial (1998). He donated his private collection of rare and out-of-print books and pamphlets on caves, caving and speleology to the USGS Library in 2000.

Dr. Halliday has also donated several collections of private papers, correspondence and research to the University of Washington Library and to the J. Willard Marriott Library of the University of Utah.

Kunz Collection
In 1933, the Library acquired the George F. Kunz collection for $1.00 from the estate of the former USGS employee and Vice-President of Tiffany & Co. The George F. Kunz Collection is a significant special collection on gems and minerals including rare books on gemology, the folklore of gemstones through history, lapidary arts and archival gem trade records important to the provenance of named stones such as the "Hope Diamond." Kunz was a former USGS employee, a vice-president of Tiffany & Co., and one of the world's preeminent gem experts. The collection was acquired through the genroisty of Dr. Kunz's heirs, Mrs. Opal Kunz and Mrs. Hans Zinsser. Mr. Walter E. Reid, mining consultant and strong friend of the library, was largely instrumental in securing the Kunz collection.

"The George F. Kunz Collection is a significant special collection of many rare books, pamphlets, and other unique materials on the acquisition, collecting and lore of jewels and precious stones. Acquired by the US Geological Survey Library in 1933 after the death of George F. Kunz, a noted mineralogist and vice-president of the Tiffany & Co. of New York, the Kunz Collection today is fairly unknown outside of a small circle of gemologists, historians, and art collectors. In this paper, a short biography of George F. Kunz is given, as well as a description of the contents and scope of his collection held in the USGS Library. Some examples of the unique materials held in the collection are shown. How the Kunz Collection is used by library patrons and museums is also discussed. Appended to the paper is a bibliography of the works by and about Dr. Kunz."

Map Collection
The library's map collections have provided invaluable aid to authorities and scientists in times of crisis (the California Northridge earthquake in 1994 and major fires in the nation's forests). Topographic maps have also been used for genealogy research to pinpoint where ancestors lived, locate forgotten cemeteries, provide information on boundary changes, and research natural and man-made changes to areas over time. Planners have used the foreign map collections to study foreign terrain, geologic conditions and natural resources. During WWII, The New York Times (June 11, 1944) reported "A 'Commando' raid by a group of civilian scientists, a search through obscure seventeenth century French manuscripts, months of study of geological reports, experiments with model beaches – all these were part of the Allied preparations for the invasion of Normandy … The dramatic story of the preparations, which began in … libraries, shifted to laboratories and ended on the shell-swept beaches …". The collections were consulted for the military interventions in Afghanistan and Iraq. Library maps have provided aid in international disaster areas such as the aftermath of Hurricane Mitch and volcanoes worldwide. A brief mention of a diamond found in the 1906 annual report of the USGS began a trail of research and investigation that led one geologist to prospect for diamonds in Canada.

Topographic Map Archive
Responsibility for the Topographic Map Archive was formally transferred to the USGS Library in Reston, Virginia, in March 2003. The Archive includes each U.S. state and territory, in all scales, editions and various printings. With coverage dating from the 1880s when the USGS began publishing standard topographic quadrangles; the Archive is the most complete collection of USGS topographic maps.

Heringen Collection
The Heringen Collection, is a group of military texts and maps, looted by the Nazis from European libraries, universities, geological societies, private businesses, homes and offices. Hidden in a potash mine in Heringen, Hesse, Germany, they were transported by the U.S. military at the end of WWII as captured war materials. Some 23,000 reports, books and maps were accepted by the USGS Library and integrated into the main collection. The materials are consulted for research ranging from European road development, water resources use or mining and construction. In 1946, the Heringen Collection was transferred from the U.S. Geological Survey's Military Geology Unit to the Library.

In an article published in journal, Earth Sciences History, the author says that the results of the German theft of Russian maps influenced the way they made maps for the next two generations. "The Heringen Collection at the US Geological Survey is a special collection of maps, books and reports stolen by units of the German Wehrmacht (armed forces) as they invaded and occupied countries during World War II. The materials in the Collection came from private, society and public library collections, and were used by military geologists in each German army to help protect its soldiers, to advance their invasion, and to consolidate their occupation. They used the maps of the occupied countries against their peoples. For a generation after the invasion of the Soviet Union, this influenced the way Russian maps were drawn and printed."

United States Antarctic Resource Center
The U.S. Antarctic Resource Center (USARC) was located at the U.S. Geological Survey (USGS) in Reston, Va. It maintained the nation's most comprehensive collection of Antarctic aerial photography, maps, charts, satellite imagery and technical reports.  When operational, it was a joint effort of the USGS National Mapping Division and the National Science Foundation United States Antarctic Program. The USARC collection includes materials produced by the following Antarctic Treaty nations: Argentina, Australia, Belgium, Brazil, Chile, China, Ecuador, Finland, France, Germany, India, Italy, Japan, the Republic of Korea, the Netherlands, New Zealand, Norway, Peru, Poland, the Russian Federation, South Africa, Spain, Sweden, the United Kingdom, the United States, and Uruguay.  For further information or assistance in obtaining Antarctic information, contact the USGS Library.

USGS Photographic Collection
The Photographic Library is an archive of still photographs and original sketches dating from the 1870s and taken by USGS scientists as part of their field studies. Topics include USGS personnel, earthquakes, volcanoes, geologic hazards and other phenomena, historical mining operations, and earth science photographs. The works of pioneer photographers such as William Henry Jackson, Timothy H. O'Sullivan, Carleton Watkins, John Karl Hillers, Thomas Moran, Andrew J. Russell, E. O. Beaman and William Bell (photographer) are represented in the collection. Some photographs have been used to illustrate publications, but most have never been published.

History
Congress authorized a Library for the United States Geological Survey (USGS) in 1879. The library was formally established in 1882, with the naming of the first librarian, Charles C. Darwin, and began with a staff of 3 and a collection of 1,400 books. The Act of Congress establishing the USGS authorized the creation of a program for exchanging copies of USGS reports for publications of state, national, and international organizations. The exchange program was modeled after a program used by Dr. Ferdinand V. Hayden when he was head of the Interior Department's U.S. Geological and Geographical Survey of the Territories (1867–1879). The U.S. Geological Survey Library inherited 1,000 volumes of serials from Dr. Hayden's former exchange program, which he had based on the program begun by the Smithsonian Institution in 1846.
After Dr. Hayden died in 1887, his widow donated his personal collection to the U.S. Geological Survey Library. Other early gifts were made by Major John Wesley Powell, second Director of the US Geological Survey, who donated his collection of State Geological Survey reports and the family of Dr. Isaac Lea (Philadelphia publisher and gem collector whose family donated nearly 600 items of his personal library). Dr. William Halliday, a world-renowned speleologist began donating his cave collection in 2003.

In a review of the USGS Library operations in 1937, William Heers, the Chief Librarian, noted that the library had more than 200,000 books and reports, about 60,000 pamphlets, and also about 60,000 maps, most of these obtained by gift and exchange. Fully half of those researchers who used the library were outside of the US Geological Survey. In service to those outside the government, between 8,000–10,000 books were loaned out each year through interlibrary loans, both within the continental US and overseas.

In a review of the USGS Library during its centennial, it was noted that in 1978 the library had acquired nearly 116,000 new items. About 75% of these were journals, of which 10,000 serial, magazine, and other periodical titles were received. In 1978, the library also circulated 105,000 items, made 17,700 interlibrary loans and answered some 27,000 requests for information.

In March 2012, the USGS Library joined the Biodiversity Heritage Library with the goal of contributing important historical works related to taxonomy as well as relevant USGS publications.

The U.S. Geological Survey Library system has become the largest earth science library in the world. Materials within the library system include books and maps dating back to the 16th and 17th centuries. Other materials include a nearly complete set of the various State Geological Survey publications and a virtually complete set of USGS topographic maps. The original collection was based on exchange partnerships with domestic and international scientific organizations.

List of USGS Library Chief Librarians
1882–1902 Charles C. Darwin, first Chief Librarian
1903–1908 Fred B. Weeks, second Chief Librarian
1908–1929 Julia L. V. McCord, third Chief Librarian
1929–1940 Guy E. Mitchell, fourth Chief Librarian
1940–1969 William H. Heers, fifth Chief Librarian
1969–1985 George H. Goodwin, Jr., sixth Chief Librarian
1985–1988 Elizabeth J. Yeates, seventh Chief Librarian
1988–1993 Barbara A. Chappell, eighth Chief Librarian
1995–1999 Edward H. Liszewski, ninth Chief Librarian
2000–2005 Nancy L. Blair, tenth Chief Librarian
2008–2013 Richard Huffine, eleventh Chief Librarian
2014–2020 Catharine Canevari, twelfth Chief Librarian

References

Bibliography
 Blair, Nancy, and R. Lee Hadden. "The USGS Library: a National Resource." People, Land & Water Mar. 2004: p. 18.
 Hadden., R. Lee. 1990. "George F. Kunz Collection, USGS Library, Reston, VA." Geoscience Information Society. Denver, CO: Geoscience Information Society, 1999. p. 123–146. 34th annual meeting, 1999. Includes bibliographic references (p. 142–146). Paper presented to the Geological Society of America Annual Convention in Denver, CO
 Hadden, Robert Lee. 2009. "The Heringen Collection of the US Geological Survey Library of Reston, Virginia." Earth Sciences History, Volume 27, Number 2. Pages 242–265. .
 Hadden, Robert Lee. 2008. "The Heringen Collection." Information Bulletin. Western Association of Map Libraries (WAML). Volume 40 (1), November 2008. . Pages 15–24.
 Heers, William H. 1937. "The U.S. Geological Survey Library." The Mineralogist. Volume V (6), pages 3–4, 27.
 Heers, William H. 1939. "Library of the United States Geological Survey." D.C. Libraries. Washington: DC Library Association. Volume X, January 1939, pages 13–16.
 Irwing, W.C. Office of the Chief Geologist. U.S. Geological Survey. Report on the Geological Survey Library: Its History, Technical Work, Resources, Management. Washington, D.C.: U.S. Geological Survey, 1962.
 Liszewski, Edward. "History of the U.S. Geological Survey Library: Our Position Within the Survey / Branch / Region; Budget, Administration, Etc." Learn About Our Library (Series of Management Presentations). National Center, Reston, Virginia. 13 and 14 Jan. 1994.
 "Media Advisory: USGS Library to Hold Grand Re-Opening." USGS News Releases. 22 Apr. 1999. U.S. Department of the Interior, U.S. Geological Survey, Office of Communication. 21 June 2006 .
 "New Library Will Contain Everything on Geology and Mining Subjects: With Completion of new building the Department of the Interior space will be available for needed expansion in Library of Geological Survey- Miss Julia L. V. McCord, Librarian, important factor in Assemblying Collection." Mining Congress Journal. October 1916. Pages 437–438. Includes a photo and short biography of Miss McCord, the Chief Librarian.
 Pangborn, Mark W. 1945. "Military Geology and the Library." Library Journal. Volume LXX, November 15, 1945, pages 1056–1057.
 Rubey, James T. 1935. "The Library of the Geological Survey." Library Journal. Volume LX, April 15, 1935, pages 330–332. Includes a brief biography of the early librarians.
 Sasscer, R. Scott. 1992. "U.S. Geological Survey Library Classification System." U.S. Geological Survey Bulletin 2010. Revised June 2000. Published in the Eastern Region, Reston, Va. Manuscript approved for publication on June 8, 2000. This revision is being released online only. It is available on the World Wide Web at: http://pubs.usgs.gov/bulletin/b2010/
 "USGS Release: Not Just Another Library –– At the USGS in Menlo Park (3/21/2001)." USGS News Releases. 21 Mar. 2001. U.S. Department of the Interior, U.S. Geological Survey. 21 June 2006 http://www.usgs.gov/newsroom/article.asp?ID=500.
 U.S. Geological Survey. Library Services Group. 2002. "Collection Development Plan." January 2002. See: http://library.usgs.gov/coldevpol.pdf
 U. S. Geological Survey Library. Reston: U.S. Department of the Interior, U.S. Geological Survey, 1970.
 U. S. Geological Survey Library. FS-125-03 ed. Reston: U.S. Geological Survey, 2003.
 Willis, Dawn E. "The History and Present Status of the Library of the United States Geological Survey." Thesis. Catholic Univ. of America, 1953.

Geography organizations
Geology of the United States
Geological surveys
Archives in the United States
Library cataloging and classification
Libraries in Washington, D.C.
Libraries in Virginia
Reston, Virginia
Libraries in Colorado
Buildings and structures in Lakewood, Colorado
Government agencies established in 1879
1879 establishments in the United States
Research libraries in the United States